Denis Suárez Fernández (born 6 January 1994) is a Spanish professional footballer who plays as a midfielder for La Liga club Espanyol, on loan from Celta Vigo.

Club career

Early years
Born in Salceda de Caselas, Pontevedra, Galicia, Suárez played youth football in his home country for Porriño Industrial and Celta Vigo.

Manchester City
Suárez signed for Manchester City on 23 May 2011. Manchester City beat off interest from Barcelona, Chelsea and rivals Manchester United signing him for an initial fee of £900,000.

Suárez played in the 2011–12 pre-season friendly match against Los Angeles Galaxy, replacing Edin Džeko in 88th minute. He also converted a penalty in the penalty shootout in the same game. He was an unused substitute in the League Cup game against Birmingham City. In the next round of the League Cup, he made his competitive debut for the club when he replaced Samir Nasri in the 67th minute in the 5–2 win against Wolverhampton Wanderers. On 17 May 2012, Suárez starred for Manchester City reserves against Manchester United reserves in Manchester Senior Cup, although Manchester City lost 0–2. In 2012, he was awarded Manchester City's Young Player of the Year as voted for by the fans.

Barcelona
On 22 August 2013, Suárez completed a transfer to Barcelona for an undisclosed fee, signing a four-year contract. During the 2013–14 season he played mostly for Barcelona B in the Spanish Segunda División to continue his development.

Sevilla (loan)

In July 2014, Suárez was loaned to Sevilla for two seasons as part of the deal which saw Ivan Rakitić move to Barcelona. He made his competitive debut on 12 August in the 2014 UEFA Super Cup at Cardiff City Stadium, playing 78 minutes before being substituted for José Antonio Reyes in the 0–2 defeat to Real Madrid. On 11 December, he scored the only goal of Sevilla's final Europa League group match against HNK Rijeka, sending the club through at the expense of their Croatian opponents.

Villarreal
On 29 August 2015, Suárez completed a transfer to Villarreal for an undisclosed fee, signing a four-year contract which includes a buy back clause.

Return to Barcelona
On 4 July 2016, Barcelona announced the return of Suárez after exercising the buy back clause. Barcelona paid €3.5 million and Suárez signed a four-year contract, with an option of a further year depending on the number of appearances. In his first season, Suárez managed only 12 La Liga starts.

Arsenal (loan)
On 30 January 2019, Arsenal signed Suárez on loan until the end of the 2018–19 season.

Celta Vigo

On 30 June 2019, Suárez signed a four-year deal to return to Celta Vigo, for a €16 million fee.

At the start of the 2022–23 season, after falling out with the club's president, Carlos Mouriño, Suárez was excluded from the first team for the rest of the campaign.

Espanyol (loan) 
On 30 January 2023, Suárez joined fellow top tier club Espanyol on loan until the end of the season, with Celta being set to receive a €200.000 fee for the immediate transfer, plus an equal fee in the case Espanyol successfully avoided relegation.

International career

Suárez has been capped by Spain U17 and has scored two goals for the team, against Moldova and Northern Ireland. He was also a member of the Spain U19 which won the 2012 Under-19 European Championship.  Suárez was a 71st-minute substitute in the final against Greece and made six appearances at the Championships, scoring twice and playing 284 minutes.

On 29 May 2016, he made his senior debut coming on as second-half substitute for David Silva in a friendly match against Bosnia and Herzegovina. A week earlier on 20 May, he had represented Galicia in the region's first match for eight years, a 1–1 draw with Venezuela.

Career statistics
.

Notes

Honours

Club
Sevilla
UEFA Europa League: 2014–15

Barcelona
La Liga: 2017–18, 2018–19
Copa del Rey: 2016–17, 2017–18
Supercopa de España: 2016

International
Spain U19
UEFA European Under-19 Championship: 2012
Spain U21
UEFA European Under-21 Championship runner-up: 2017

Individual 

 Manchester City's Young Player of the Year: 2011–12

References

External links

FC Barcelona official profile

1994 births
Living people
People from Vigo (comarca)
Sportspeople from the Province of Pontevedra
Spanish footballers
Footballers from Galicia (Spain)
Association football midfielders
Celta de Vigo B players
Manchester City F.C. players
FC Barcelona Atlètic players
Sevilla FC players
Villarreal CF players
FC Barcelona players
Arsenal F.C. players
RC Celta de Vigo players
RCD Espanyol footballers
Segunda División players
La Liga players
Premier League players
UEFA Europa League winning players
Spain youth international footballers
Spain under-21 international footballers
Spain international footballers
Spanish expatriate footballers
Spanish expatriate sportspeople in England
Expatriate footballers in England